"Defender" is the first single from British recording artist Peter Andre's seventh studio album, Accelerate. The single was released on 24 October 2010 via Digital Download, with a physical release following a day later, exclusive to retailer ASDA. The song was written by Peter Andre, Dantae Johnson, Nait Rawknait Masuku, and was produced by Nait Rawknait Masuku & Dantae Johnson with additional keyboards, drum programming and mixing by Pete "Boxsta" Martin.

Music video
The "Defender" music video was directed by Peter Falloon and portrays Andre performing militant choreography with several dancers. The video was inspired by Janet Jackson, with Andre commenting "Style wise I can definitely admit to borrowing a bit of Rhythm Nation."

Live performance
On 17 October 2010, Andre performed the song on the live Strictly Come Dancing results show. Andre has also performed the song on The Alan Titchmarsh Show and Live from Studio Five, both performances occurred on 25 October 2010. He also performed the song on Daytime TV show This Morning.

Critical reception
Nick Levine of Digital Spy gave the song a mixed review stating:  He may have all the credibility of an Apprentice candidate trying to flog some rather stodgy-looking bread rolls at £1.82 a pop, but, for a popstar in the commercial tundra of 2010, Peter Andre's actually doing pretty well. Last year's comeback platter Revelation debuted at number three on the UK albums chart and went on to shift a not-too-shabby 300,000 copies. <p> 'Defender', the trailer for its efficiently-assembled follow-up Accelerate, is a melodramatic pop-R&B midtempo that works the corny old love-is-war metaphor to death. It's not the freshest production you'll hear all year, and the chorus is a way off deadly, but for a single from someone who owes his second shot at pop paydirt to a romance with a glamour model on a reality show where everyone gets upstaged by the dismembered dangly bits of a kangaroo, it's not half bad. .

Track listing

Charts

Release history

References

2010 singles
Peter Andre songs
Songs written by Peter Andre
2010 songs